Clara de Montargis is a 1951 French drama film directed by Henri Decoin and starring Ludmilla Tchérina, Michel François and Roland Armontel. It was made at the Epinay Studios in Paris. The film's sets were designed by the art director René Renoux.

Cast
 Ludmilla Tchérina as Clara 
 Michel François as L'ivrogne  
 Paul Bisciglia
 Paul Bonifas 
 Maurice Chevit as Edouard - le majordome  
 Yvonne Claudie 
 Espanita Cortez
 Marius David
 Madeleine Delavaivre as Madame Bonacieux 
 Guy Derlan 
 Catherine Fath 
 Maud Lamy
 Robert Le Fort as Le garçon d'hôtel  
 René Lestelly 
 Henri Marchand
 Jean Meyer as D'Artagnan / Albert  
 Félix Paquet
 Jean Piat as Jean-Claude  
 Françoise Prévost  
 Hélène Rémy as Aramis  
 Louis Seigner as Le mari de Clara  
 Made Siamé 
 Jacques Tarride 
 Max Tréjean

References

Bibliography 
 Rège, Philippe. Encyclopedia of French Film Directors, Volume 1. Scarecrow Press, 2009.

External links 
 

1951 films
1951 drama films
French drama films
1950s French-language films
Films directed by Henri Decoin
French black-and-white films
1950s French films
Films shot at Epinay Studios
Films set in Paris